Lyngseidet (also  or ) is the administrative centre of Lyngen Municipality in Troms og Finnmark county, Norway.

The village is home to two grocery stores, Lyngen Church, nursing home, schools, daycare, pharmacy and library. A nine meter tall plastic  figure Santa Claus named Gollis is also located here.

References

External links
Official tourist page of the Lyngen region

Villages in Troms
Populated places of Arctic Norway
Lyngen